Hari Dhakal is a Nepalese politician and member of Rastriya Swatantra Party. He was elected to the House of Representative in 2022 from Chitwan-1.

References 

Rastriya Swatantra Party politicians
Nepal MPs 2022–present
1983 births
Living people